Naphat Seesraum (Thai นภัทร สีเสริม),  is a Thai international footballer who plays as a midfielder.

Clubs

Honours

International
Thailand 
 AFC Women's Championship: fifth place: 2014
 AFF Women's Championship: 2011, 2015
 runner-up: 2007
 third place: 2008, 2012
 Southeast Asian Games: Gold Medal: 2007, 2013
 Silver Medal: 2009

International goals

Clubs
RBAC
 Thai Women's Premier League: 2009, 2010

BG Bundit Asia
 Thai Women's Premier League: 2011, 2013

References

External links
 
 
 
Siamport 

1987 births
Living people
2015 FIFA Women's World Cup players
Women's association football midfielders
Naphat Seesraum
Naphat Seesraum
Naphat Seesraum
Speranza Osaka-Takatsuki players
Expatriate women's footballers in Japan
Thai expatriates in Japan
Footballers at the 2006 Asian Games
Footballers at the 2010 Asian Games
Footballers at the 2014 Asian Games
Naphat Seesraum
Naphat Seesraum
Naphat Seesraum
Southeast Asian Games medalists in football
Competitors at the 2007 Southeast Asian Games
Competitors at the 2009 Southeast Asian Games
Competitors at the 2013 Southeast Asian Games
Competitors at the 2017 Southeast Asian Games
Naphat Seesraum